The 1997 Tipperary Senior Hurling Championship was the 107th staging of the Tipperary Senior Hurling Championship since its establishment by the Tipperary County Board in 1887. The championship began on 4 October 1997 and ended on 2 November 1997.

Boherlahan-Dualla were the defending champions, however, they were defeated by Clonoulty-Rossmore at the quarter-final stage.

On 2 November 1997, Clonoulty-Rossmore won the championship after a 0-17 to 1-12 defeat of Mullinahone in the final at Semple Stadium. It was their third championship title overall and their first title since 1989.

Qualification

Results

Quarter-finals

Semi-finals

Final

Championship statistics

Top scorers

Top scorers overall

Top scorers in a single game

Miscellaneous
 Clonoulty-Rossmore win their first title since 1989.
 Mullinahone qualify for the final for the first time.

External links

 The 1997 Senior Hurling Championship

References

Tipperary
Tipperary Senior Hurling Championship